William Roth (1921–2003) was an American lawyer and politician from Delaware.

William Roth or Bill Roth may also refer to:
                              
 William M. Roth (1916–2014), American businessman and politician from California
 Bill Roth (sportscaster) (20th–21st century), American television and radio sportscaster